Sceptridium oneidense, the blunt-lobed grapefern, is a fern species in the family Ophioglossaceae.

Description 
The leaf blades of S. oneidense are ternately compound. The spores mature in late fall in panicles that rise above the sterile fronds.

Taxonomy
At first, S. oneidense was considered a variety of Botrychium dissectum, then a form of it, then possibly a hybrid species. However, after a more detailed study by Wagner in 1961, it was considered its own species.

Distribution and habitat
S. oneidense grows in moist woodlands in eastern United States and Canada from New Brunswick to Ontario and south to North Carolina. In Canada, it is a relatively rare species, usually only found in large groups of Botrychium obliquum.

References

Ophioglossaceae
Ferns of the United States
Ferns of Canada
Plants described in 1901